This article describes the history of New Zealand cricket from the 1970–71 season until 2000.

New Zealand's outstanding player in this period was the great fast bowler and all-rounder Richard Hadlee.

Domestic cricket
The Plunket Shield was replaced in 1974 by the Shell Trophy after Shell Oil became the principal sponsor of New Zealand cricket.

Plunket Shield winners
 1970–71 – Central Districts
 1971–72 – Otago
 1972–73 – Wellington 
 1973–74 – Wellington

Shell Trophy winners
 1974–75 – Otago 
 1975–76 – Canterbury
 1976–77 – Otago 
 1977–78 – Auckland
 1978–79 – Otago 
 1979–80 – Northern Districts 
 1980–81 – Auckland 
 1981–82 – Wellington 
 1982–83 – Wellington 
 1983–84 – Canterbury 
 1984–85 – Wellington 
 1985–86 – Otago 
 1986–87 – Central Districts 
 1987–88 – Otago 
 1988–89 – Auckland 
 1989–90 – Wellington 
 1990–91 – Auckland
 1991–92 – Central Districts & Northern Districts shared
 1992–93 – Northern Districts
 1993–94 – Canterbury 
 1994–95 – Auckland 
 1995–96 – Auckland 
 1996–97 – Canterbury 
 1997–98 – Canterbury 
 1998–99 – Central Districts Stags 
 1999–2000 – Northern Districts Knights

International tours of New Zealand

England 1970–71
 [ 1st Test] at Lancaster Park, Christchurch – England won by 8 wickets
 [ 2nd Test] at Eden Park, Auckland – match drawn

Pakistan 1972–73
 [ 1st Test] at Basin Reserve, Wellington – match drawn
 [ 2nd Test] at Carisbrook, Dunedin – Pakistan won by an innings and 166 runs
 [ 3rd Test] at Eden Park, Auckland – match drawn

Australia 1973–74
 [ 1st Test] at Basin Reserve, Wellington – match drawn
 [ 2nd Test] at Lancaster Park, Christchurch – New Zealand won by 5 wickets
 [ 3rd Test] at Eden Park, Auckland – Australia won by 297 runs

England 1974–75
 [ 1st Test] at Eden Park, Auckland – England won by an innings and 83 runs
 [ 2nd Test] at Lancaster Park, Christchurch – match drawn

India 1975–76
 [ 1st Test] at Eden Park, Auckland – India won by 8 wickets
 [ 2nd Test] at Lancaster Park, Christchurch – match drawn
 [ 3rd Test] at Basin Reserve, Wellington – New Zealand won by an innings and 33 runs

Australia 1976–77
 [ 1st Test] at Lancaster Park, Christchurch – match drawn
 [ 2nd Test] at Eden Park, Auckland – Australia won by 10 wickets

England 1977–78
 [ 1st Test] at Basin Reserve, Wellington – New Zealand won by 72 runs
 [ 2nd Test] at Lancaster Park, Christchurch – England won by 174 runs
 [ 3rd Test] at Eden Park, Auckland – match drawn

Pakistan 1978–79
 [ 1st Test] at Lancaster Park, Christchurch – Pakistan won by 128 runs
 [ 2nd Test] at McLean Park, Napier – match drawn
 [ 3rd Test] at Eden Park, Auckland – match drawn

DH Robins' XI 1979–80

West Indies 1979–80

India 1980–81
 [ 1st Test] at Basin Reserve, Wellington – New Zealand won by 62 runs
 [ 2nd Test] at Lancaster Park, Christchurch – match drawn
 [ 3rd Test] at Eden Park, Auckland – match drawn

Australia 1981–82
1st Test at Basin Reserve, Wellington – match drawn
2nd Test at Eden Park, Auckland – New Zealand won by 5 wickets
3rd Test at Lancaster Park, Christchurch – Australia won by 8 wickets

Sri Lanka 1982–83
 [ 1st Test] at Lancaster Park, Christchurch – New Zealand won by an innings and 25 runs
 [ 2nd Test] at Basin Reserve, Wellington – New Zealand won by 6 wickets

England 1983–84
 [ 1st Test] at Basin Reserve, Wellington – match drawn
 [ 2nd Test] at Lancaster Park, Christchurch – New Zealand won by an innings and 132 runs
 [ 3rd Test] at Eden Park, Auckland – match drawn

Pakistan 1984–85
 [ 1st Test] at Basin Reserve, Wellington – match drawn
 [ 2nd Test] at Eden Park, Auckland – New Zealand won by an innings and 99 runs
 [ 3rd Test] at Carisbrook, Dunedin – New Zealand won by 2 wickets

Australia 1985–86
 [ 1st Test] at Basin Reserve, Wellington – match drawn
 [ 2nd Test] at Lancaster Park, Christchurch – match drawn
 [ 3rd Test] at Eden Park, Auckland – New Zealand won by 8 wickets

West Indies 1986–87
 [ 1st Test] at Basin Reserve, Wellington – match drawn
 [ 2nd Test] at Eden Park, Auckland – West Indies won by 10 wickets
 [ 3rd Test] at Lancaster Park, Christchurch – New Zealand won by 5 wickets

England 1987–88
 [ 1st Test] at Lancaster Park, Christchurch – match drawn
 [ 2nd Test] at Eden Park, Auckland – match drawn
 [ 3rd Test] at Basin Reserve, Wellington – match drawn

Pakistan 1988–89
 [ 1st Test] at Carisbrook, Dunedin – game abandoned: heavy rain prevented the toss and any play; called off on the third day
 [ 2nd Test] at Basin Reserve, Wellington – match drawn
 [ 3rd Test] at Eden Park, Auckland – match drawn

Australia 1989–90
 [ 1st Test] at Basin Reserve, Wellington – New Zealand won by 9 wickets

India 1989–90
 [ 1st Test] at Lancaster Park, Christchurch – New Zealand won by 10 wickets
 [ 2nd Test] at McLean Park, Napier – match drawn
 [ 3rd Test] at Eden Park, Auckland – match drawn

Sri Lanka 1990–91
 [ 1st Test] at Basin Reserve, Wellington – match drawn
 [ 2nd Test] at Trust Bank Park, Hamilton – match drawn
 [ 3rd Test] at Eden Park, Auckland – match drawn

England 1991–92
 [ 1st Test] at Lancaster Park, Christchurch – England won by an innings and 4 runs
 [ 2nd Test] at Eden Park, Auckland – England won by 168 runs
 [ 3rd Test] at Basin Reserve, Wellington – match drawn

Australia 1992–93
 [ 1st Test] at Lancaster Park, Christchurch – Australia won by an innings and 60 runs
 [ 2nd Test] at Basin Reserve, Wellington – match drawn
 [ 3rd Test] at Eden Park, Auckland – New Zealand won by 5 wickets

Pakistan 1992–93
 [ 1st Test] at Trust Bank Park, Hamilton – Pakistan won by 33 runs

India 1993–94
 [ 1st Test] at Trust Bank Park, Hamilton – match drawn

Pakistan 1993–94
 [ 1st Test] at Eden Park, Auckland – Pakistan won by 5 wickets
 [ 2nd Test] at Basin Reserve, Wellington – Pakistan won by an innings and 12 runs
 [ 3rd Test] at Lancaster Park, Christchurch – New Zealand won by 5 wickets

India 1994–95

South Africa 1994–95
 [ 1st Test] at Eden Park, Auckland – South Africa won by 93 runs

Sri Lanka 1994–95
 [ 1st Test] at McLean Park, Napier – Sri Lanka won by 241 runs
 [ 2nd Test] at Carisbrook, Dunedin – match drawn

West Indies 1994–95
 [ 1st Test] at Lancaster Park, Christchurch – match drawn
 [ 2nd Test] at Basin Reserve, Wellington – West Indies won by an innings and 322 runs

Pakistan 1995–96
 [ 1st Test] at Lancaster Park, Christchurch – Pakistan won by 161 runs

Zimbabwe 1995–96
 [ 1st Test] at Trust Bank Park, Hamilton – match drawn
 [ 2nd Test] at Eden Park, Auckland – match drawn

England 1996–97
 [ 1st Test] at Eden Park, Auckland – match drawn
 [ 2nd Test] at Basin Reserve, Wellington – England won by an innings and 68 runs
 [ 3rd Test] at Lancaster Park, Christchurch – England won by 4 wickets

Sri Lanka 1996–97
 [ 1st Test] at Carisbrook, Dunedin – New Zealand won by an innings and 36 runs
 [ 2nd Test] at Trust Bank Park, Hamilton – New Zealand won by 120 runs

Australia 1997–98

Bangladesh 1997–98
Bangladesh toured New Zealand in November and December 1997 and played four first-class and four List A matches. Bangladesh had not yet been granted full international status, so there were no Tests.

Zimbabwe 1997–98
 [ 1st Test] at Basin Reserve, Wellington – New Zealand won by 10 wickets
 [ 2nd Test] at Eden Park, Auckland – New Zealand won by an innings and 13 runs

India 1998–99
 [ 1st Test] at Carisbrook, Dunedin – game abandoned: no toss was made; abandoned due to persistent rain
 [ 2nd Test] at Basin Reserve, Wellington – New Zealand won by 4 wickets
 [ 3rd Test] at WestpacTrust Park, Hamilton – match drawn

South Africa 1998–99
 [ 1st Test] at Eden Park, Auckland – match drawn
 [ 2nd Test] at Jade Stadium, Christchurch – match drawn
 [ 3rd Test] at Basin Reserve, Wellington – South Africa won by 8 wickets

Australia 1999–2000
 [ 1st Test] at Eden Park, Auckland – Australia won by 62 runs
 [ 2nd Test] at Basin Reserve, Wellington – Australia won by 6 wickets
 [ 3rd Test] at WestpacTrust Park, Hamilton – Australia won by 6 wickets

West Indies 1999–2000
 [ 1st Test] at WestpacTrust Park, Hamilton – New Zealand won by 9 wickets
 [ 2nd Test] at Basin Reserve, Wellington – New Zealand won by an innings and 105 runs

See also
History of cricket in New Zealand

References

External sources
 CricketArchive – New Zealand season itineraries

Annual reviews
 Playfair Cricket Annual 1971 to 2000 editions
 Wisden Cricketers' Almanack 1971 to 2000 editions

Further reading
 Bill Frindall, The Wisden Book of Test Cricket 1877–1978, Wisden, 1979
 Don Neely & Richard Payne, Men in White: The History of New Zealand International Cricket, 1894–1985, Moa, Auckland, 1986